The Shuffles were a Dutch pop band formed in Rosmalen, North Brabant. The group, fronted by the late Albert West, were active for ten years from 1963 until 1973.

Discography

Singles
 2012 – "Worth" 
 1969 – "Cha-La-La, I Need You" (NL: No. 2)
 1970 – "Believe Now in Tomorrow" 
 1970 – "Bitter Tears" (NL: No. 8)
 1970 – "Teardrop on Teardrop" (NL: No. 25)
 1970 – "The Way the Music Goes" (NL: No. 12)
 1970 – "Without You" (NL: No. 16)
 1971 – "Glory, Glory"
 1971 – "I Give You My Love"

References

Dutch pop music groups
Musical groups established in 1963
Musical groups disestablished in 1973
Musical groups from North Brabant
's-Hertogenbosch